The World War II Allied names for Japanese aircraft were reporting names, often described as codenames, given by Allied personnel to Imperial Japanese aircraft during the Pacific campaign of World War II. The names were used by Allied personnel to identify aircraft operated by the Japanese for reporting and descriptive purposes. Generally, Western men's names were given to fighter aircraft, women's names to bombers, transports, and reconnaissance aircraft, bird names to gliders, and tree names to trainer aircraft.

The use of the names, from their origin in mid-1942, became widespread among Allied forces from early 1943 until the end of the war in 1945.  Many subsequent Western histories of the war have continued to use the names.

History
During the first year of the Pacific War beginning on 7 December 1941, Allied personnel often struggled to quickly, succinctly, and accurately identify Japanese aircraft encountered in combat. They found the Japanese designation system bewildering and awkward, as it allocated two names to each aircraft. One was the manufacturer's alphanumeric project code, and the other was the official military designation, which consisted of a description of the aircraft plus the year it entered service. For example, the military designation of the Mitsubishi A5M fighter was the "Navy Type 96 Carrier Fighter". Type 96 meant that the aircraft had entered service in Imperial year 2596, equivalent to Gregorian calendar year 1936. Other aircraft, however, which had entered service the same year carried the same type number; aircraft such as the Type 96 Carrier Bomber and the Type 96 Land Attack Bomber. Adding to the confusion, the US Army and US Navy each had their own different systems for identifying Japanese aircraft.

In mid-1942, Captain Frank T. McCoy, a United States Army Air Forces military intelligence officer from the 38th Bombardment Group assigned to the Allied Technical Air Intelligence Unit in Australia, set out to devise a simpler method for identifying Japanese aircraft. Together with Technical Sergeant Francis M. Williams and Corporal Joseph Grattan, McCoy divided the Japanese aircraft into two categories; fighters and everything else. He gave boys' names to the fighters, and girls' names to the others. Later, training aircraft were named after trees, single engine reconnaissance aircraft were given men's names and multi-engine aircraft of the same type were given women's names. Transports were given girls' names that all began with the letter "T". Gliders were given the names of birds.

McCoy's system quickly caught on and spread to other US and Allied units throughout the Pacific theater. By the end of 1942, all American forces in the Pacific and east Asia had begun using McCoy's system, and British Commonwealth nations adopted the system shortly thereafter. The list eventually included 122 names and was used until the end of World War II. To this day, many Western historical accounts of the Pacific War still use McCoy's system to identify Japanese aircraft.

In an effort to make the names sound somewhat comical, McCoy gave many of the aircraft 'hillbilly' names, such as "Zeke" and "Rufe," that he had encountered while growing up in Tennessee. Others were given names of people the creators of the system knew personally; the Mitsubishi G4M bomber, with its large gun blisters was named "Betty" in homage to a busty female friend of Williams. The Aichi D3A "Val" got its name from an Australian Army sergeant.

Not all of McCoy's chosen names caught on. Many Allied personnel continued calling the Mitsubishi Navy Type 0 Carrier Fighter "Zero" instead of McCoy's name of "Zeke."  Also, McCoy's name for an upgraded version of the Zero, "Hap," in tribute to US Army general Henry H. Arnold, had to be changed to "Hamp" when it was learned that Arnold disapproved.

List of names

See also
 List of Japanese aircraft in use during the Second Sino-Japanese War
 List of aircraft of Japan during World War II
 'Type' designation in Japan
 Japanese military aircraft designation systems
 NATO reporting name – a similar system implemented in the Cold War for Soviet and Chinese aircraft

References
Explanatory notes

Citations

Bibliography

 
 
 
 
 
 
 
 
 

Military terminology
Pacific theatre of World War II
Japan